Gonzalo Rodríguez (14 May 1925 – 31 October 2002) was a Mexican sprinter. He competed in the men's 100 metres at the 1948 Summer Olympics.

References

External links
 

1925 births
2002 deaths
Athletes (track and field) at the 1948 Summer Olympics
Mexican male sprinters
Olympic athletes of Mexico
Place of birth missing
20th-century Mexican people